Toulgarctia griveaudi is a moth in the family Erebidae. It was described by Hervé de Toulgoët in 1957. It is found on Madagascar.

References

Moths described in 1957
Spilosomina